This article provides a list of foreign cultural institutes in Paris. Not all of these institutes are still operational. For example, the Institut néerlandais closed in 2013.

Gallery

References 
  Centres culturels étrangers - Official Paris website
  Membres du FICEP - Forum des instituts culturels étrangers à Paris

 
Foreign cultural institutes in Paris